Jon Davis (born 1952) is an American poet.

Biography
Davis was born in New Haven, Connecticut, and received a B.A. in English and an M.F.A. in creative writing from the University of Montana, where he was editor of the literary journal, CutBank. He has served as writing program coordinator for the Fine Arts Work Center in Provincetown, edited the literary journals Shankpainter and Countermeasures: A Magazine of Poetry & Ideas, and taught at the University of Montana, College of Santa Fe (now Santa Fe University of Art and Design), and Salisbury State University. He is currently a professor at the Institute of American Indian Arts in Santa Fe, New Mexico.

Jon Davis is the author of five chapbooks and six full-length collections of poetry. The awards Davis has received include the Lannan Literary Award, two National Endowment for the Arts Fellowships, and the Lavan Younger Poets Award from the Academy of American Poets.

He wrote the screenplay for the short film The Burden Carriers, which was screened at ImagineNative Film Festival in Toronto and at the Santa Fe Film Festival, and for The Hand Drum, a National Geographic All Roads Festival selection.

Works
Preliminary Report (Copper Canyon Press, 2010)
Local Color (Palanquin Press, 1995),
Scrimmage of Appetite (Akron University Press, 1995),
The Hawk. The Road. The Sunlight After Clouds (Owl Creek Press, 1995)
Dangerous Amusements (Ontario Review Press, 1987)

Critical assessment

Jon Davis received effusive praise from David Foster Wallace in an otherwise scathing criticism of prose poetry. Wallace commented "a poet whom this reviewer'd never heard of before but whose pieces in this anthology are so off-the-charts terrific that the reviewer has actually gone out and bought the one Jon Davis book mentioned in his bio-note and may very well decide to try to advertise it in this magazine, at reviewer's own expense if necessary—that's how good this guy is."

References

External links
Official blog

1950 births
American male poets
Living people
Institute of American Indian Arts faculty